Suzhou Rail Transit, also known as Suzhou Metro, is a rapid transit system serving the city of Suzhou, in Jiangsu Province, China. Line 1 began operation on April 28, 2012. Line 2 opened on December 28, 2013. A further three lines, and an extension of Line 2, were completed between 2016 and 2021. Line S1 of Suzhou Metro connecting neighboring Kunshan city and beyond to the Shanghai Metro is also currently under construction.

Daily ridership increased from 680,000 (2017 average) to 899,000 (2018 average) to 995,000 (2019 average). Record ridership increased from 1,130,000 (30 April 2017) to 1,548,000 (2 May 2019 record).

Lines

Line 1 

Line 1 opened on April 28, 2012. It is a line running generally east–west, from Mudu station in western Suzhou to Zhongnan Jie station in Suzhou Industrial Park.

Construction on Line 1 began on December 26, 2007, and was completed by 2012. On December 30th, 2011 the first 21 cars for Line 1 have been delivered.

Line 2

Line 2 opened on December 28, 2013. It is a line running generally north–south, from Suzhou North Railway Station in north Xiangcheng District to Baodaiqiao South station close to Precious Belt Bridge located in Wuzhong District.

Construction on Line 2 began on December 25, 2009, and was completed by early 2013. On December 28th, 2013, line 2 started service and became a part of Suzhou Rail Transit system. The new 13 stations were opened on September 24, 2016.

Line 3 

Line 3 started trial operations from December 6 to December 10, 2019 and officially started operation on December 25, 2019. Line 3 got approval to start construction on January 20, 2012. The line is an east–west line, leading from Suzhou Xinqu Railway Station to Weiting. Weiting will also be the first station of the future Line S1, a line that is planned to interchange with Line 11 of Shanghai Metro at Huaqiao station.

Line 4 

Line 4 started trial operations on April 14, 2017. The line starts in the north of Suzhou, west of Line 2. Its main line leads from Longdaobang to Tongli in the south/south east of Suzhou. After reaching Suzhou railway station, it approximately follows Renmin road and Dongwubei road reaching further south until Tongli in Wujiang District. The Southwest Branch of Line 4 is the first phase of the future Line 7. This branch is supposed to follow the same path as the main line until Hongzhuang, then turning into south western direction leading to Youxiang Road.

Line 5 

Line 5 opened on 29 June 2021 and runs from Taihu Xiangshan to Yangchenghu South.

Lines under construction

Line 6

Line 7 

Line 7 is an east–west line of Suzhou Rail Transit. Construction started on December 25, 2019. It is scheduled to open in December 2024.

Line 8 

Line 8 is 35.5 km in length with 28 stations. It is scheduled to open in September 2024.

Line 10 

Line 10 is an north south express regional rapid transit line of Suzhou Rail Transit. The first section connecting the northern neighboring cities of Zhangjiagang and Changshu. The line was formerly known as Line S5.

Line 11 

Line 11 (formerly Line S1) is an east west intercity rapid transit line of Suzhou Rail Transit. It will serve Kunshan City and connects to Shanghai Metro, with the terminal station of Huaqiao also being an interchange station where passengers can interchange to Line 11 (Shanghai Metro).

Lines under planning

Rolling Stock 
All rolling stocks of Suzhou Rail Transit use Nanjing Puzhen Rolling Stock Works trains.

Fares and tickets
As September 24, 2016, the highest fare is 8 yuan (US$1.33).

Users of the Suzhou Tong get a 5% discount for every journey.

Gallery

Network Map

See also

 Suzhou Tram
 Suzhou BRT
 List of metro systems

References

External links 

 The official site of Suzhou Rail Transit

 
2012 establishments in China
Rapid transit in China